The Mosquito Control EP is the first studio release by American post-metal band Isis, released in 1998 by Escape Artist. The piece runs fluently through all 29 minutes, and all four songs are linked through consistent bouts of chaos and lyrics glued by the metaphor of using mosquitoes as a symbol for mankind, society, and population control.

Background
The Mosquito Control EP introduces Isis's first major theme, the mosquito. The reissue of this EP features cover art depicting control towers (the central theme of Celestial).

Although it represents Isis' first studio release, it is actually their third recording as a group after two demo productions. The EP was the last recording containing founding member Chris Mereschuk, and Randy Larson left the band shortly before its recording; as such, “[t]here are things on this record that certainly would not  been written were it not for those people, and it represented a set of voices that was no longer apparent in the subsequent recordings.” Sonically, Aaron Turner feels that Isis “were starting to find [their] voice” with the release, citing “Life Under the Swatter” as “the beginning of a path on which we would synthesize heavy riffing with complex rhythmic patterns and textural/subdued passages”.

The recording process cost as little as $600 and lasted between three and four days. The first mix was deemed of insufficient quality, so a remastering was undertaken in 2002. In 2018, a remastered version was released with new artwork under Hydra Head.

"Relocation Swarm" features dialogue sampled from the season two finale of Twin Peaks.

Track listing

Personnel

Band members
 Jeff Caxide – bass guitar
 Aaron Harris – drums
 Chris Mereschuk – electronics, vocals
 Aaron Turner – guitar, vocals, design, assembly

Other personnel
 Kurt Ballou – audio engineering, producing
 Dave Merullo – mastering, audio editing

References

External links 
 The Mosquito Control EP at Bandcamp (streamed copy where licensed)

Isis (band) albums
1998 EPs
Concept albums
Albums with cover art by Aaron Turner
Albums produced by Kurt Ballou